North Tyneside General Hospital is a district general hospital located on Rake Lane in North Shields, Tyne and Wear. It is managed by Northumbria Healthcare NHS Foundation Trust.

History
The hospital, which replaced several other local hospitals, was built between 1984 and 1985 and was officially opened by Princess Alexandra in May 1985. In May 2018 it was announced that the urgent care centre at the hospital would no longer be available but instead the hospital would offer a GP-led healthcare service.

See also
 List of hospitals in England

References

External links
Official site

Hospital buildings completed in 1996
NHS hospitals in England
Hospitals in Tyne and Wear